The 1996 World Rally Championship was the 24th season of the FIA World Rally Championship. The season consisted of 9 rallies. As a result of their  disqualification, Toyota Team Europe were not allowed to compete in this year's championship, so only three works teams contested the championship. The drivers' world championship was won by Tommi Mäkinen in a Mitsubishi Lancer Evo 3, ahead of Colin McRae and Carlos Sainz. The manufacturers' title was won by Subaru.

Calendar

Teams and drivers

Major Entries

Privater Entries

Results and standings

Drivers' championship

Manufacturers' championship
Each works team had to nominate up to three drivers 30 days before each event; only two best placed nominated drivers were eligible to score points for the manufacturers' championship.

Events

FIA 2 Litre World Cup For Manufacturers

() Denotes dropped score

External links 

 FIA World Rally Championship 1996 at ewrc-results.com

World Rally Championship
World Rally Championship seasons